The Cromer Campus of the Northern Beaches Secondary College is a government-funded co-educational  comprehensive secondary day school, located in , a suburb on the Northern Beaches of Sydney, New South Wales, Australia.

Established in 1976 as Cromer High School, the campus caters for approximately 730 students from Year 7 to Year 12. The school is operated by the New South Wales Department of Education; the principal is Justin Hong.

Facilities
The school provides services for students such as extension classes for gifted students and talented programs catering for higher ability students. Cromer Campus also provides a gymnasium, networked IT lab, drama and art studios as well as large playing fields, netball courts and basketball courts.

Sexual abuse claims and murder investigations 
Sexual abuse claims about both male and female teachers grooming and having sexual relationships with students during the 1980s came to light as part of The Teacher's Pet podcast into the disappearance of Lynette Dawson. In August 2022, Physical Education teacher Chris Dawson was convicted of the murder of Lynette Dawson, his former wife.

Several teachers at Cromer and other northern beaches schools were identified by former children as grooming students. Peter Wayne Scott, a former teacher, was found guilty in 2014 of homosexual sex with a minor, indecent assault, and providing a stupefying drug for the purpose of having homosexual sex with a minor from his activities at the school between 1984 and 1986.

Notable alumni 
George Smith - Wallaby and rugby union player, inaugural John Eales Medalist, 7 time Wallaby captain

See also 

 List of government schools in New South Wales
 Education in Australia

References

External links 
 
 

Educational institutions established in 1969
1969 establishments in Australia
Public high schools in Sydney
Northern Beaches